John Robinson (born 1887) was an English footballer who played for Stoke.

Career
Robinson was born in Birmingham and began his career with Aston Villa before joining Stoke in 1911. He turn out eight times for the "Potters" before leaving to play amateur football with King's Heath Birmingham.

Career statistics

References

English footballers
Aston Villa F.C. players
Stoke City F.C. players
1887 births
Year of death missing
Date of death missing
Place of death missing
Association football midfielders